Solløkka is a residential- and statistical area (grunnkrets) in Sandefjord municipality, Vestfold County, Norway. Solløkka is home to a boat harbor and beach in innermost Lahellefjord. A number of cabins and vacation homes can be found at Solløkka, as well as a campground (“Solløkka camping og leirsted”). It is home to a 70-meter sandy beach. It is known for its many vacation homes and summer cabins. Solløkka Beach is located at the base of the Lahellefjord.

The statistical area Solløkka, which also can include the peripheral parts of the village as well as the surrounding countryside, has a population of 331.

Solløkka is located east of Lahelle. It is considered a part of the urban settlement Sandefjord, which covers the greater Sandefjord city area and stretches towards Stokke and into peripheral parts of Larvik municipality. The urban settlement Sandefjord has a population of 39,849, of which 39,144 people live within Sandefjord.

References

Villages in Vestfold og Telemark